Skurup is a locality and the seat of Skurup Municipality, Skåne County, Sweden with 7,565 inhabitants in 2010.

References 

Populated places in Skurup Municipality
Populated places in Skåne County
Municipal seats of Skåne County
Swedish municipal seats